Butofilolol (trade name Cafide) is a beta-blocker drug for the treatment of essential hypertension (high blood pressure). It is not known to be marketed anywhere.

References 

Beta blockers